The Spårvägsmuseet, or Tramway Museum, was located at Tegelviksgatan 22 in Södermalm, Stockholm, Sweden. It was owned and operated by Storstockholms Lokaltrafik (the Greater Stockholm Local Transit Company), and shows the development of public transportation in the Stockholm area from the 1650s until today. The Museum's mission also covers contemporary and future public transport in the Stockholm region, and water transportation in the area. The museum also houses a library, an archive and a café. 

The museum closed to the public in September 2017 and reopened in May 2022 in a former gasworks building in the Hjorthagen neighbourhood.

History
Tramway manager Ernst Hjortzberg began collecting items around the turn of the 19th century, when horse trams still ran on Stockholm's streets. A small private museum was at the company headquarters on Tegnérgatan. Among the first vehicles to be preserved was horsecar number 12, one of the first trams in Sweden.

In 1944 the museum was opened to the public on Tulegatan, near an old tram depot. In 1964 the museum was moved to Odenplan metro station where horsecar 12 was displayed on the platform, but the space available was limited and it was not possible to have many exhibits.

In 1990 the Spårvägsmuseum relocated to a more suitable location at Tegelviksgatan 22, the ground floor of the Söderdepån tram and bus depôt in Södermalm. Much more of the collection was accessible to the public, and attractions included a mini-metro for children to ride.

On September 10, 2017 the Södermalm site closed as the Söderdepån depôt was slated for demolition and redevelopment. Its new location, originally slated to open in 2020 but delayed until May 2022, is in Building 9 of the former Värtagasverket gasworks. The 1893 structure was designed by Ferdinand Boberg and was the scrubbing  plant.

Exhibits
The museum owns approximately 60 trams, buses, trolleybuses, suburban rail and metro cars, most of which were located on site. Others are on the Lidingöbanan, Roslagsbanan, Saltsjöbanan and in the metro, where they operate during special events, and on the Djurgård line. The museum's collections also include an extensive drawing archive, photo collection and reference library.

The permanent exhibit of vehicles and objects illustrated the history of public transport. The oldest vehicle in the collection is a horse omnibus, the so-called Wurst, probably built sometime in the 1840s. It is likely the oldest preserved public transit vehicle in Sweden. As well Nya Spårvägsaktiebolag horsecar 12, another highlight of the collection is Stockholms Södra Spårvägsaktiebolags (Stockholm Southern Track Road Company) electric streetcar number 14, constructed in 1901.

Gallery

References

External links

Official website
Flickr: Pictures
Tram Travels: Stockholm Transport Museum

Museums in Stockholm
Museums established in 1944
Railway museums in Sweden
Technology museums
1944 establishments in Sweden